This is a list of prime ministers of Niger since the formation of the post of Prime Minister of Niger in 1983 to the present day.

A total of fifteen people have served as Prime Minister of Niger (not counting one Acting Prime Minister). Additionally, three persons, Mamane Oumarou, Amadou Cissé and Hama Amadou have served on two non-consecutive occasions.

The current Prime Minister of Niger is Ouhoumoudou Mahamadou, since 3 April 2021.

Key
Political parties

Other factions

Status

List of officeholders

Timeline

See also
 Politics of Niger
 List of heads of state of Niger
 List of colonial governors of Niger

References

External links
 World Statesmen – Niger

Niger
Political history of Niger
Government of Niger
 
Prime ministers